Bordolano is a comune (municipality) in the Province of Cremona in the Italian region Lombardy, located about  southeast of Milan and about  north of Cremona.

Bordolano borders the following municipalities: Casalbuttano ed Uniti, Castelvisconti, Corte de' Cortesi con Cignone, Quinzano d'Oglio.

References

Cities and towns in Lombardy